Mikawa Bay (三河湾 Mikawa-wan) is a bay to the south of Aichi Prefecture, Japan, surrounded by Chita Peninsula to the west and Atsumi Peninsula to the east and south. Its area is approximately 604 km2. Pollution of the shallow, enclosed waters of the bay has become a concern in recent years.

Islands
 Shinojima :ja:篠島
 Himakajima :ja:日間賀島
 Sakushima :ja:佐久島
 Tsukumijima
 Nezujima
 Takeshima :ja:竹島 (愛知県)
 Kajishima :ja:梶島 
 Butsu
 Mikawa Oshima :ja:三河大島
 Mikawa Kojima
 Maeshima :ja:前島 (愛知県)
 Okishima :ja:沖島 (愛知県)
 Himeshima :ja:姫島 (愛知県田原市)
 Nojima

Bays of Japan
Landforms of Aichi Prefecture